Paralepas minuta is a species of goose barnacle in the family Heteralepadidae.

Description
P. minuta is a small stalked barnacle, its body reaching lengths of no more than 5 mm and widths of about 3.8 mm. The body is roughly globular and does not bear valves; it is slightly wrinkled and yellow in colour. The stalk (peduncle) is very short (about 1 mm) and heavily contracted. The base is usually divided into two finger-like projections that grip its anchoring substrate. It has repeatedly been found attached to the spines of deep-water sea urchins.

Distribution
The species has a wide distribution and occurs in the Mediterranean and off West and South Africa, Japan, the Philippines, and Australia, at depths of 110–414 m.

References 

Crustaceans described in 1836
Crustaceans of South Africa
Barnacles